Old Dorm may refer to any of the buildings on numerous college campuses with, or previously having, the proper name, including:
Brossman Center, which has the 1889 Old Dorm facade at the Lutheran Theological Seminary at Philadelphia
Pennsylvania Hall (Gettysburg, Pennsylvania), of 1838 at Gettysburg College
Schmucker Hall of 1832 at the Lutheran Theological Seminary at Gettysburg
McCormick Road Dormitories at the University of Virginia, generally referred to as "Old Dorms"